Plessix-Balisson is a former commune in the Côtes-d'Armor department of Brittany in northwestern France. On 1 January 2017, it was merged into the new commune Beaussais-sur-Mer.

With an area of only eight hectares, Plessix-Balisson was the smallest commune of the region and the second smallest in France, after Castelmoron-d'Albret.

Population

See also
Communes of the Côtes-d'Armor department

References

External links

Website 

Former communes of Côtes-d'Armor
Enclaves and exclaves